CSHS may stand for:

Caboolture State High School
Cactus Shadows High School
Cairns State High School
Caloundra State High School, in Caloundra, Sunshine Coast Region, Queensland, Australia
Cardinal Spellman High School (New York City)
Carine Senior High School
Carl Sandburg High School
Cheyenne South High School
Churchlands Senior High School
Coburg Senior High School
College Station High School
Coral Springs High School
Corinda State High School
Crawfordsville Senior High School